The G10 includes ten countries identified by the World Trade Organization which are "vulnerable" to imports due to ongoing reform in the agricultural sector. The group of ten consists of Switzerland, Japan, South Korea, Taiwan, Liechtenstein, Israel, Norway, Iceland, Bulgaria and Mauritius.

Agriculture in Japan